Nicholas Berry (born 16 April 1963) is a retired English actor and pop singer. He is best known for his roles as Simon Wicks in  EastEnders from 1985 to 1990, and as PC Nick Rowan in Heartbeat from 1992 to 1998. He sang UK chart singles with "Every Loser Wins" in 1986, which went to number one, and the theme song from Heartbeat, a cover of the Buddy Holly song "Heartbeat", in 1992.

Career
Berry started acting at the age of eight. After attending the Sylvia Young Theatre School in London he played minor parts on television, film, and stage until his big break playing Simon 'Wicksy' Wicks in the popular BBC soap opera EastEnders, joining the series shortly after its inception in 1985 and staying until the end of 1990. Berry's character was thought up overnight and had been scheduled to appear later. However, he was introduced to restore the cast balance distorted by the unexpected departure of actor David Scarboro who played the original Mark Fowler. Scarboro's departure meant many of his functions as one of the senior of the young characters would need to be taken over by another character and thus Wicksy was introduced rather sooner than originally planned and Berry was cast with minimal delay. He was quickly hailed as EastEnders''' top pin-up and during this time was besieged by fan mail from female admirers.

Berry soon took a break from EastEnders to tour and make an album from which the number-one single "Every Loser Wins" came in 1986. The song was heavily featured within EastEnders in a plotline referred to as The Banned in which the youths of Albert Square formed a pop group and performed the songs on screen. It was the second-biggest-selling single in the UK that year, remaining at number one for three weeks. Its composers Simon May, Stewart James and Bradley James each received an Ivor Novello Award. The self-titled album, from which "Every Loser Wins" hails, has never been released in CD format.

Berry returned to EastEnders after his musical career stalled but left again in an 'open to return' storyline which was aired in December 1990. His character has only made one brief re-appearance since in an episode dated 13 January 2012, marking the funeral of his on-screen mother, played by Pam St Clement.

In 1992, Berry was cast in the role of policeman PC (later Sgt) Nick Rowan in ITV's drama series Heartbeat (1992–98). Berry recorded the title song "Heartbeat" in 1992, a cover of the 1959 Buddy Holly hit, which reached number two in the UK singles chart and spawned a second album. His wife Rachel Robertson also appeared in the series in small one-off roles.
Berry’s stint ended with a one-off twin episode special showing his character's new career as a Royal Canadian Mounted Police Officer.

In 1998, Berry left Heartbeat for the BBC One series Harbour Lights. Shot around the area of Bridport he played a harbourmaster. Less successful than his two previous character-based programmes, it ran for two series.

Berry's other credits include The Mystery of Men with Neil Pearson and Warren Clarke, Paparazzo, "Duck Patrol", The Black Velvet Band with Todd Carty, and playing the maverick cop Liam Ketman alongside Stephen Tompkinson in the BBC crime drama In Deep.

Berry retired from acting and ran his own production company called Valentine Productions.  Berry resigned from the company in October 2019 (Companies House Records) 

Personal life
Just before he joined the cast of EastEnders, Berry fractured his skull in a car crash but went on to make a full recovery.

During his time in EastEnders'', Berry dated fellow cast member Gillian Taylforth, who played Kathy Beale.

Berry married actress Rachel Robertson in 1994. They have two boys, Louis (born 1995) and Finley (born 1998), and the family resides in Epping, Essex.

Berry is a supporter of West Ham United F.C.

Filmography

Films

TV

Discography

Albums

* The two identically titled albums are different.

Singles

References

External links

Nick Berry – BBC Drama
Nick Berry as Nick Rowan – 'Heartbeat'

1963 births
Living people
English male soap opera actors
English male film actors
Alumni of the Sylvia Young Theatre School
People from Epping
People from Woodford, London
BBC Records artists